Furlane or friulanes, also known as Gondolier slippers, are Venetian shoe slippers. Characterised by their flexible rubber soles, these casual shoes are usually flats or low heels, with velvet fabric uppers.

Origin
The furlane shoe originated in Venice, near the countryside of Friuli towards the end of the Second World War. It was an expression of Venetian fashion in spite of rationing during the post-War economic crisis.

Red Cross nurses gathered the donations of velvet and fabric, as well as old rubber, from private donors and small businesses. They were used to offer simple and practical jobs to the unoccupied in various hospitals, such as the Military Hospital, the Morelli di Popolo, and the Regina Margherita.

Sold on the Rialto Bridge, they then appeared on the feet of the Venetian gondoliers, who used them to protect the wood of the gondolas.

Modern furlanes
Furlane shoes came back into fashion in 2016. They have often been reshaped into a modified, elongated shape that has a small heel and a slightly peaked toe.

Worn at the Venice Biennale, the furlane shoes won appeal for their origin in recycled materials, and adaptability.

Manufacture

The manufacture of furlane is generally more intricate than other slippers, with the upper part being the most complex to manufacture.In the post-war era when the economic crisis left the Red Cross gathering materials for the people of Friuli, Furlane shoes were started by some ladies from Friuli, who, using fabric, layered the cloth from old clothes, sheets, and pieces of tablecloth. Each swatch was bound and cut with a sharp knife to form a comfortable sole. Over time, the cloth sole was replaced with the runner from bicycle tyres, which is sometimes still used today.

See also
 Bast shoes, similar footwear in Balto-Slavic cultures of identical etymological derivation (from fiber used in their manufacture)
 Espadrille, casual shoe with rope sole
 Waraji, light tie-on sandals
 Okobo, Traditional Japanese platform clogs
 Zori, Flat Japanese sandals

References

Shoes
Sandals
Folk footwear